A first-degree relative (FDR) is a person's parent (father or mother), full sibling (brother or sister) or child. It constitutes a category of family members that largely overlaps with the term nuclear family, but without spouses. 

If the persons are related by blood, the first degree relatives share approximately 50% of their genes. First-degree relatives are a common measure used to diagnose risks for common diseases by analyzing family history.

See also
Second-degree relatives
Third-degree relatives
Family
Next of kin

References

Family